This list of notable breast cancer patients includes people who made significant contributions to their respective fields and who were diagnosed with breast cancer at some point in their lives, as confirmed by public information.

According to the United States National Cancer Institute, an estimated 252,710 new cases and 40,610 deaths (women only; no estimates for male victims due to size of sampling pool) would occur in the United States in 2017.

Alive
Barbara Allen (born 1961), American politician, Kansas state senator.
Anastacia (born 1968), American singer and former dancer ("I'm Outta Love", "Left Outside Alone", "Paid My Dues").
Christina Applegate (born 1971), Primetime Emmy Award-winning American actress and dancer (Married... with Children, Friends, Samantha Who?, Dead to Me).
Dame Eileen Atkins (born 1934), English stage, film and television actress (Cranford, Vanity Fair, The Crown).
Brigitte Bardot (born 1934), French animal rights activist and former actress.
Marie-Christine Barrault (born 1944), French actress.
Kathy Bates (born 1948), Academy Award-winning American actress (Misery, Titanic, Primary Colors, American Horror Story). Also surviving ovarian cancer and lymphedema.
Pat Battle (born 1959), American journalist.
Meredith Baxter (born 1947), American actress and producer.
Allyce Beasley (born 1951), American actress.
Sarah Beeny (born 1972), English broadcaster and entrepreneur.
Vanessa Bell Calloway (born 1957), American actress.
Joan Bennett Kennedy (born 1936), former wife of U.S. Senator Edward M. Kennedy.
Jami Bernard (born 1956), American author; New York Daily News film critic.
Judy Blume (born 1938), American writer diagnosed with invasive ductal carcinoma in August 2012; long-term cervical cancer survivor.
Raelene Boyle (born 1951), Australian athlete. (also surviving ovarian cancer)
Julia Bradbury (born 1970), Irish-born English television presenter and journalist.
Rhona Brankin (born 1950), Scottish politician and Member of the Scottish Parliament.
Nancy Brinker (born 1946), American founder of the Susan G. Komen for the Cure organization.
Malandra Burrows (born 1965), English actress and singer (Emmerdale).
Anna Calder-Marshall (born 1947), English actress.
Calypso Rose (born 1940), Tobagonian calypso musician.
Edna Campbell (born 1968), American professional basketball player.
Sarah Cawood (born 1972), English broadcaster and presenter.
Robin Carnahan (born 1961), American politician, former Missouri Secretary of State.
Agnes Chan (born 1955), Hong Kong-born Japanese singer, television personality, university professor, essayist and novelist.
Beth Nielsen Chapman (born 1958), American singer-songwriter.
Lois Chiles (born 1947), American actress and fashion model.
Mary Jo Codey (born 1955), former First Lady of New Jersey.
Cheryl Crane (born 1943), American writer, real estate broker and model.
Beverley Craven (born 1963), British singer-songwriter ("Promise Me").
Peter Criss (born 1945), American rock musician and drummer (Kiss).
Sheryl Crow (born 1962), American singer, songwriter and musician.
Pat Danner (born 1934), American politician.
Victoria Derbyshire (born 1968), British journalist, newsreader and broadcaster.
Janice Dickinson (born 1955), American television personality, model, businesswoman and writer.
Shannen Doherty (born 1971), American actress, director and producer.
Anita Doth (born 1971), Dutch singer-songwriter.
Susan Duncan (born 1951), Australian author, journalist and editor.
Sally Dynevor (born 1963), English actress (Coronation Street).
Brenda Edwards (born 1969), English singer, actress and television presenter (The X Factor, Loose Women).
Jill Eikenberry (born 1947), American film, stage and television actress.
Victoria Ekanoye (born 1981), English actress (Coronation Street).
Linda Ellerbee (born 1944), American journalist, newsreader and author.
Melissa Etheridge (born 1961), American singer-songwriter and lesbian rights activist.
Marianne Faithfull (born 1946), English singer and actress ("As Tears Go By").
Edie Falco (born 1963), American film, stage and television actress.
Rita Fan (born 1945), Hong Kong politician.
Deanna Favre (born 1968), American author and wife of American football quarterback Brett Favre.
Catrin Finch (born 1980), Welsh harpist, arranger, composer and former Royal Harpist.
Carly Fiorina (born 1954), American business executive.
Caitlin Flanagan (born 1961), American magazine writer, editor and author.
Peggy Fleming (born 1948), American Olympic champion figure skater.
Jane Fonda (born 1937), American actress, activist and former fitness guru.
Jennie Formby (born 1960), British trade unionist and politician.
Maria Friedman (born 1960), British actress and singer (EastEnders).
Liza Goddard (born 1950), English actress.
Kim Gordon (born 1953), American musician, vocalist, visual artist, record producer, video director, fashion designer and actress.
Ernie Green (born 1938), American former professional football player (Cleveland Browns).
Jennifer Griffin (born 1969), American journalist.
Namrata Singh Gujral (born 1976), Indian-American actress. Treated for breast cancer and Burkitt's lymphoma; pending remission from both cancers.
Dorothy Hamill (born 1956), American Olympic champion figure skater.
Jane Hamsher (born 1959), American film producer, author and liberal blogger.
Dame Sheila Hancock (born 1933), English stage, film and television actress.
Samantha Harris (born 1973), American television personality, presenter and model.
Marica Hase (born 1981), Japanese pornographic actress and AV idol.
Teresa Heinz (born 1938), Portuguese-American businesswoman, philanthropist and wife of American politician John Kerry.
Heidi Heitkamp (born 1955), American lawyer and politician; United States Senator from North Dakota (elected 2012).
Laura Ingraham (born 1963), American radio presenter and pundit.
Kate Jackson (born 1948), American actress and producer.
Ann Jillian (born 1950), American film, television and musical theatre actress.
Betsey Johnson (born 1942), American fashion designer.
Melanie Johnson (born 1955), British Labour politician, former Member of Parliament.
Susan Kadis (born 1953), Canadian politician in the House of Commons of Canada.
Koh Chieng Mun (born 1960), Singaporean actress. 
Hoda Kotb (born 1964), American television newsreader, journalist and correspondent.
Sandra Lee (born 1966), American television chef and author.
Julia Louis-Dreyfus (born 1961), American actress and comedian.
Geralyn Lucas (born 1967), American journalist, television producer and writer.
Lorna Luft (born 1952), American actress and singer.
Joan Lunden (born 1950), American television journalist and newsreader.
Lauren Mahon (born 1985), British cancer activist and podcast presenter (You, Me and the Big C).
Zoleka Mandela (born 1980), South African writer; she was treated for breast cancer in 2011, which returned in 2016.
Marisa Acocella Marchetto (born 1962), American writer, cartoonist and memoirist.
Debbie McGee (born 1958), English television, radio and stage performer.
Carol McGiffin (born 1960), English radio and television presenter (Loose Women).
Judy Eason McIntyre (born 1945), American politician.
Amanda Mealing (born 1967), English actress, director and producer (Casualty, Holby City).
Tucker L. Melancon (born 1946), American judge.
Wendy Mesley (born 1957), Canadian reporter.
Hayley Mills (born 1946), English actress.
Kylie Minogue (born 1968), Australian singer and actress (Neighbours, "Spinning Around", "Can't Get You Out of My Head", "Get Outta My Way").
Andrea Mitchell (born 1946), American television journalist, newsreader, reporter and commentator.
Hala Moddelmog (born 1956), American president and CEO of Susan G. Komen for the Cure.
Dame Jenni Murray (born 1950), English journalist and broadcaster.
Sue Myrick (born 1941), American politician.
Janet Napolitano (born 1957), American politician.
Martina Navratilova (born 1956), Czech-American former professional tennis player.
Cynthia Nixon (born 1966), American stage, film and television actress (Sex and the City, Ratched, Killing Reagan).
Linda Nolan (born 1959), Irish singer, actress and former member of the 1970s pop band The Nolans.
Tig Notaro (born 1971), American comedian and podcast presenter; diagnosed and treated with double mastectomy in 2012.
Kim Novak (born 1933), American film and television actress.
Sandra Day O'Connor (born 1930), American retired attorney and first female Associate Justice of the Supreme Court of the United States.
Patrícia Pillar (born 1964), Brazilian television, stage and film actress.
Giuliana Rancic (born 1974), Italian-American television personality and infotainer.
Judy Rankin (born 1945), American professional golfer.
Betsy Rawls (born 1928), American professional golfer.
Jodi Rell (born 1946), American politician, Governor of Connecticut.
 Gina Riley (born 1961), Australian actress and singer (Kath & Kim).
Amy Robach (born 1973), American television news correspondent.
Robin Roberts (born 1960), American basketball player, television broadcaster and LGBT rights activist.
Krysta Rodriguez (born 1984), American actress and singer (The Addams Family, Smash).
Betty Rollin (born 1936), American author and retired television correspondent.
Ann Romney (born 1949), American philanthropist, author and wife of American U.S. senator Mitt Romney; she was diagnosed with mammary ductal carcinoma in situ and had a lumpectomy.
Richard Roundtree (born 1942), American actor and former model.
Deidre Sanders (born 1945), English columnist and agony aunt (This Morning).
Jennifer Saunders (born 1958), English comedian, screenwriter and actress (Absolutely Fabulous, French and Saunders, Shrek 2).
Debbie Wasserman Schultz (born 1966), American politician.
Debra Shipley (born 1957), British politician.
Carly Simon (born 1943), American singer-songwriter and memoirist.
Jaclyn Smith (born 1945), American actress and businesswoman.
Dame Maggie Smith (born 1934), English stage, film and television actress (Harry Potter, Downton Abbey, Sister Act).
Suzanne Somers (born 1946), American actress, fitness guru and businesswoman.
Koo Stark (born 1956), American pornographic actress and photographer.
Gloria Steinem (born 1934), American feminist activist.
Mindy Sterling (born 1953), American film, television and voice actress.
Anne Swarbrick (born c. 1952), Canadian politician and activist.
Ruth Ann Swenson (born 1959), American operatic soprano.
Stephanie Swift (born 1972), American pornographic actress and 2006 AVN Hall of Fame inductee.
Wanda Sykes (born 1964), American writer, actress, television presenter and stand-up comedian.
Joni Eareckson Tada (born 1949), American singer, radio personality and advocate for the disabled.
Gwen Taylor (born 1939), English actress (Heartbeat, Coronation Street, Barbara, Duty Free, EastEnders).
Sam Taylor-Johnson (born 1967), English filmmaker, director and photographer.
Maura Tierney (born 1965), American film and television actress.
Jools Topp (born 1958), New Zealand folk singer, one of the Topp Twins.
Dawn Upshaw (born 1960), American opera singer.
Laurita Valenzuela (born 1931), Spanish television presenter and actress.
Ann Veneman (born 1949), American politician and former Head of the U.S. Department of Agriculture.
Joyce Wadler (born 1948), American journalist and memoirist (also surviving ovarian cancer).
Liza Wang (born 1947), Hong Kong television personality, actress, singer and diva.
Sian Williams (born 1964), Welsh journalist and current affairs presenter.
Rita Wilson (born 1956), American actress, singer and producer.
Samantha Womack (born 1972), English actress, singer, model and director (EastEnders, Mount Pleasant, Eurovision Song Contest 1991).

Died from breast cancer
Josephine Abady (1949–2002; aged 52), American theatre director and producer.
Anna Abrikosova, Mother Catherine of Siena, O.P. (1882–1936; aged 54), prominent figure in the Catholic Church in Russia.
Kathy Acker (1947–1997; aged 50), American author.
Judith Adams (1943–2012; aged 68), New Zealand-born Australian politician, midwife, nurse and farmer.
Ingela Agardh (1948–2008; aged 59), Swedish journalist and television personality.
Kathy Ahern (1949–1996; aged 47), American professional golfer.
Shammi Akhtar (1957–2018; aged 60), Bangladeshi playback singer.
Claudia Alexander (1959–2015; aged 56), Canadian-born American geophysicist and planetary scientist.
Margery Allingham (1904–1966; aged 62), English novelist and mystery writer.
Cecilia Alvear (1939–2017; aged 77), Ecuadorian-born American journalist.
Tun Endon Mahmood Ambak (1940–2005; aged 64), wife of the 5th Prime Minister of Malaysia, Tun Abdullah Ahmad Badawi. Her twin sister, Noraini, also died from breast cancer in 2003.
Generosa Ammon (1956–2003; aged 47), American cause célèbre.
Chrissy Amphlett (1959–2013; aged 53), Australian musician and actress. She died from breast cancer and multiple sclerosis.
Luana Anders (1938–1996; aged 58), American film and television actress.
Elda Emma Anderson (1899–1961; aged 61), American physicist and health researcher. She died from breast cancer and leukemia.
V.C. Andrews (1923–1986; aged 63), American novelist and horror fiction writer.
Mary Anning (1799–1847; aged 47), English paleontologist and fossil collector.
Sólveig Anspach (1960–2015; aged 54), Icelandic-born French film director and screenwriter.
Mary Astell (1666–1731; aged 64), English philosopher and feminist writer.
Aïda Ba (1983–2022; aged 39), French rugby union player.
Fay Baker (1917–1987; aged 70), American actress and novelist.
Jeanne Bal (1928–1996; aged 67), American actress and model.
Rim Banna (1966–2018; aged 51), Palestinian singer, composer and activist.
Harriet Barber (1968–2014; aged 46), English figurative painter.
Judi Bari (1949–1997; aged 47), American environmentalist and labor leader.
Lisa A. Barnett (1958–2006; aged 47), American science fiction writer and editor. She died from breast cancer and a brain tumour.
Alexandra Bastedo (1946–2014; aged 67), British model and actress.
Jeanne Bates (1918–2007; aged 89), American film, radio and television actress.
Sally Belfrage (1936–1994; aged 57), American-born British author and journalist.
Rajae Belmlih (1962–2007; aged 45), Moroccan-Emirati singer.
Valérie Benguigui (1961–2013; aged 47), French actress and theater director.
Caroline Benn (1926–2000; aged 74), American-born British educationalist and writer.
Ingrid Bergman (1915–1982; aged 67), Academy Award-winning Swedish film and stage actress.
Dame Patricia Bergquist (1933–2009; aged 76), New Zealand zoologist and taxonomist.
Sonja, Countess Bernadotte af Wisborg (1944–2008; aged 64), second wife of Count Lennart Bernadotte.
Juliet Berto (1947–1990; aged 42), French actress, director and screenwriter.
Betty Berzon (1928–2006; aged 78), American psychotherapist and lesbian activist.
Bibi Besch (1942–1996; aged 54), Austrian-American actress.
Audrey Best (1960–2011; aged 50), Montreal-based French lawyer and second wife of Lucien Bouchard.
Rose Bird (1936–1999; aged 63), first female Chief Justice of California.
Rachel Bissex (1956–2005; aged 48), American folk singer-songwriter.
Helen Blackwood, Baroness Dufferin and Claneboye (1807–1867; aged 60), British songwriter, composer, poet and author. 
Patricia Blair (1933–2013; aged 80), American film and television actress.
Rachael Bland (1978–2018; aged 40), Welsh journalist and podcast presenter (You, Me and the Big C).
Yelena Bondarchuk (1962–2009; aged 47), Soviet and Russian actress.
Alison Booker (1963–2010; aged 47), English radio broadcaster.
Bimba Bosé (1975–2017; aged 41), Italian-born Spanish model, designer, singer and actress.
Yvonne Brill (1924–2013; aged 88), Canadian-American aerospace engineer.
Coral Browne (1913–1991; aged 77), Australian-born American actress.
Coosje van Bruggen (1942–2009; aged 66), Dutch-American sculptor, art historian and critic.
Heidi Brühl (1942–1991; aged 49), German actress.
Michelle Brunner (1953–2011; aged 57), British bridge player, writer and teacher.
Christine Buckley (1946/1947–2014; aged 66–67), Irish activist and campaigner.
Mary-Ellis Bunim (1946–2004; aged 57), American film and television producer.
Anna Bunina (1774–1829; aged 55), Russian poet and writer.
Helen Callaghan (1923–1992; aged 69), Canadian-born left-handed center fielder who played in the All-American Girls Professional Baseball League for five seasons in the 1940s.
Blanche Calloway (1902–1978; aged 76), American jazz singer, composer and bandleader.
Phyliss Carr (1939–2006; aged 66), American singer (The Quin-Tones).
Rachel Carson (1907–1964; aged 56), American environmental activist and author of Silent Spring.
Yvonne Carter (1959–2009; aged 50), British general practitioner and academician.
Rose Chan (1925–1987; aged 62), Chinese-born Malaysian exotic dancer.
Debra Chasnoff (1957–2017; aged 60), American documentary filmmaker (Deadly Deception: General Electric, Nuclear Weapons and Our Environment).
Dorothy Cheney (1950–2018; aged 58), American scientist.
Susan Chilcott (1963–2003; aged 40), English soprano.
A. V. Christie (1963–2016; aged 53), American poet.
Doris Coley (1941–2000; aged 58), American singer (The Shirelles).
Jackie Collins (1937–2015; aged 77), British-American romance novelist and actress.
Joan Riddell Cook (1922–1995; aged 73), American journalist and labor activist and founder of J.A.W.S. (Journalism and Women Symposium).
Sara Coward (1948–2017; aged 69), English actress and writer.
Yvonne Craig (1937–2015; aged 78), American actress and dancer.
Norma Crane (1928–1973; aged 44), American stage, film and television actress.
Linda Creed (1948–1986; aged 37), American songwriter and lyricist.
Candy Csencsits (1955–1989; aged 33), American athlete and bodybuilder.
Charlotte Cushman (1816–1876; aged 59), American stage actress.
Virgilia D'Andrea (1888–1933; aged 45), Italian political activist and poet.
Maggie Daley (1943–2011; aged 68), First Lady of Chicago.
Faye Dancer (1925–2002; aged 77), American baseball player.
Tamara Danz (1952–1996; aged 43), German lyricist and singer.
Julia Darling (1956–2005; aged 48), English novelist, poet and dramatist.
Della Davidson (1952–2012; aged 60), American modern dancer, choreographer and dance professor.
Janet Davies (1927–1986; aged 59), English actress (Dad's Army).
Bette Davis (1908–1989; aged 81), American Academy Award-winning actress.
Jo Ann Davis (1950–2007; aged 57), American politician.
Priscilla Davis (1942–2001; aged 59), American socialite.
Martina Davis-Correia (1967–2011; aged 44), American civil rights and anti-capital punishment activist.
Linda Day (1938–2009; aged 71), American television director.
Sandra Deal (1942–2022; aged 80), American education advocate and First Lady of Georgia (2011–2019).
Shelagh Delaney (1938–2011; aged 72), English dramatist and screenwriter.
Willey Glover Denis (1879–1929; aged 49), American biochemist and physiologist.
Thérèse DePrez (1965–2017; aged 52), American production designer.
Lhasa de Sela (1972–2010; aged 37), Mexican-American-Canadian singer-songwriter.
Antoinette-Thérèse Des Houlières (1659–1718; aged 59), French poet.  
Antoinette du Ligier de la Garde Deshoulières (1638–1694; aged 56), French poet.
Lydia de Vega (1964–2022; aged 57), Filipino Olympic athlete.
Helen Dewar (1936–2006; aged 70), American journalist and news reporter.
Marilou Diaz-Abaya (1955–2012; aged 57), Filipino award-winning film director.
Gail Dolgin (1945–2010; aged 65), American documentary filmmaker.
Anna Donald (1966–2009; aged 42), Australian physician, epidemiologist, and medical researcher, journalist and blogger.
Sister Dora (1832–1878; aged 46), English nun and nurse.
Sarah Dorsey (1829–1879; aged 50), American novelist and historian.
Regina Dourado (1952–2012; aged 59), Brazilian film and television actress.
Siobhan Dowd (1960–2007; aged 47), British children's writer and activist.
Shirley Graham Du Bois (1896–1977; aged 80), American author, playwright, composer, activist and wife of W.E.B. DuBois.
Peggy Duff (1910–1981; aged 71), British political activist and organiser of the Campaign for Nuclear Disarmament.
Lucy, Lady Duff-Gordon (1863–1935; aged 71), London-born Canadian fashion designer.
Carmen Duncan (1942–2019; aged 76), Australian actress and activist.
Joan Eardley (1921–1963; aged 42), Scottish artist.
Elizabeth Edwards (1949–2010; aged 61), American lawyer, author, health care activist and wife of U.S. Senator from North Carolina John Edwards.
Barbara Ehrenreich (1941–2022; aged 81), American author, political activist and ethicist.
Eva Ekvall (1983–2011; aged 28), Venezuelan television newsreader, author and former Miss Venezuela.
Julie Ege (1943–2008; aged 64), Norwegian actress and model.
Lorraine Elliott (1943–2014; aged 70), Australian politician.
Belinda Emmett (1974–2006; aged 32), Australian actress and singer.
Miriam Engelberg (1958–2006; aged 48), San Francisco, California-based graphic writer and blogger.
Margaret Ewing (1945–2006; aged 60), Scottish politician, journalist and teacher.
Judith Exner (1934–1999; aged 65), American author.
Oriana Fallaci (1929–2006; aged 77), Italian writer and journalist.
Sally Farmiloe (1948–2014; aged 66), South Africa-born British actress.
Heather Farr (1965–1993; aged 28), American LPGA Tour professional golfer.
Sandra Feldman (1939–2005; aged 65), former President of the American Federation of Teachers.
Kathleen Ferrier (1912–1953; aged 41), British contralto singer.
Kristina Fetters (1980–2014; aged 34), American convicted murderer.
Harriet Fier (1950–2018; aged 67), American magazine editor.
Saint Lucy Filippini (1672–1732; aged 69), Italian Catholic nun and educator.
Pegeen Fitzgerald (1904–1989; aged 84), American radio personality. 
Lesley Fitz-Simons (1961–2013; aged 51), Scottish actress.
Kaci Kullmann Five (1951–2017; aged 65), Norwegian politician.
Jean B. Fletcher (1915–1965; aged 50), American architect.
Karen Wynn Fonstad (1945–2005; aged 59), American cartographer and academic.
Char Fontane (1952–2007; aged 55), American actress and singer.
Lona Foote (1951–1993; aged 42), American photographer.
Mary Lou Forbes (1926–2009; aged 83), American journalist and commentator.
Syvilla Fort (1917–1975; aged 58), American dancer, choreographer and dance teacher.
Lacey Fosburgh (1942–1993; aged 50), American journalist and author.
Karen Fraction (1958–2007; aged 49), American actress, dancer and model.
Kay Francis (1905–1968; aged 63), American film and stage actress.
Margaret Frazer (1946–2013; aged 66), American historical novelist.
Marti Friedlander (1928–2016; aged 88), British-New Zealand photographer.
Georgia Frontiere (1927–2008; aged 80), American businesswoman and entertainer.
Loie Fuller (1862–1928; aged 65), French-based American dancer and choreographer.
Margaret Furse (1911–1974; aged 63), British costumer.
Irina Gabashvili (1960–2009; aged 48), Georgian-born Soviet gymnast.
Bea Gaddy (1933–2001; aged 68), American politician.
Helen Gahagan Douglas (1900–1980; aged 79), American actress and politician.
Jane Garrett (1973–2022; aged 49), Australian politician.
Sophie Germain (1776–1831; aged 55), French mathematician.
Rebekah Gibbs (1973–2014; aged 41), English actress.
Margaret Gibson (1948–2006; aged 57), Canadian novelist and short story writer.
Louan Gideon (1955–2014; aged 58), American actress and musician.
Marie-Suzanne Giroust (1734–1772; aged 38), French painter. 
Barbara Gittings (1932–2007; aged 74), American LGBT rights activist.
Jacqueline Gold (1960–2023; aged 62), English businesswoman and Chief Executive Officer of Ann Summers.
Kathi Kamen Goldmark (1948–2012; aged 63), American author, columnist, publishing consultant and music producer. 
Arlene Gottfried (1950–2017; aged 66), American photographer. 
Kate Greenaway (1846–1901; aged 55), English Victorian illustrator and artist. 
Vanessa Greene (1954–2017; aged 63), British-American television producer and screenwriter. 
Lady Augusta Gregory (1852–1932; aged 80), Irish nationalist writer and landowner.
Nanci Griffith (1953–2021; aged 68), American singer-songwriter and guitarist.
Linda Griffiths (1953–2014; aged 57), Canadian actress and playwright. 
Anne Grommerch (1970–2016; aged 45), French politician. 
Alvaleta Guess (1955–1996; aged 40), American actress and singer. 
Sunny Hale (1968–2017; aged 48), American polo player. 
Alaina Reed Hall (1946–2009; aged 63), American actress. 
Beverly Hall (1946–2015; aged 68), American educator. 
Pia Hallström (1961–2016; aged 55), Swedish politician, MP for Värmland (2010–2016). 
Florence Halop (1923–1986; aged 63), American comedian and actress. Died from breast and lung cancer.
Fannie Lou Hamer (1917–1977; aged 59), American civil rights and anti-segregation activist.
Kipp Hamilton (1934–1981; aged 45), American actress.
Virginia Hamilton (1936–2002; aged 67), American novelist and children's book author.
Shelley Hamlin (1949–2018; aged 69), American professional golfer.
Emma Hannigan (1972–2018; aged 45), Irish author and blogger.
Sarah Harding (1981–2021; aged 39), English singer, model and actress (Girls Aloud, Popstars: The Rivals, Coronation Street).
Patricia Roberts Harris (1924–1985; aged 60), American politician, diplomat and first African-American U.S. Cabinet Secretary.
Cathy Harvin (1953–2010; aged 56), American politician.
Sara Henderson (1936–2005; aged 68), Australian author and pastoralist.
Ángela Hernández (1990–2022; aged 31), Colombian politician, lawyer and journalist.
Dorothy Hewett (1923–2002; aged 79), Australian writer, poet and playwright.
Regine Hildebrandt (1941–2001; aged 60), German biologist and politician.
Jacqueline Hill (1929–1993; aged 63), British actress (Doctor Who).
Sylvia Hitchcock (1946–2015; aged 69), American model, beauty queen and Miss USA and Miss Universe 1967.
Klara Pölzl Hitler (1860–1907; aged 47), Austrian mother of Adolf Hitler.
Nina Hoekman (1964–2014; aged 49), Ukrainian-born Dutch draughts player and coach.
Anita Hoffman (1942–1998; aged 56), American writer, Yippie activist and prankster.
Judy Holliday (1921–1965; aged 43), American actress, singer and comedian.
Shirley Horn (1934–2005; aged 71), American jazz singer. She had also been battling diabetes and arthritis.
Mary Sue Hubbard (1931–2002; aged 71), American businesswoman, religious figure and third wife of L. Ron Hubbard, founder of Dianetics.
Faith Hubley (1924–2001; aged 77), American artist and animator.
Karina Huff (1961–2016; aged 55), British actress, showgirl and television personality (The House of Clocks, Time for Loving, Voices from Beyond).
Diana Hyland (1936–1977; aged 41), American stage, film and television actress.
Trina Schart Hyman (1939–2004; aged 65), American children's book illustrator.
Jill Ireland (1936–1990; aged 54), English actress and singer.
Molly Ivins (1944–2007; aged 62), American journalist, author and newspaper columnist.
Tiffany Jackson (1985–2022; aged 37), American basketball player.
Alice James (1848–1892; aged 43), American diarist.
Rita Henley Jensen (1947–2017; aged 70), American journalist and founder of Women's eNews.
Jocelyne Jocya (1942–2003; aged 61), French singer-songwriter and children's rights advocate.
E. Pauline Johnson (1861–1913; aged 51), Canadian poet and orator.
Puma Jones (1953–1990; aged 36), American singer (Black Uhuru).
Vivien Jones (1951–2010; aged 59), British award-winning professional lacrosse player and physical education teacher.
June Jordan (1936–2002; aged 62), American academic, educator, poet, essayist and author.
Helen Kane (1904–1966; aged 62), American actress and singer.
Tzeni Karezi (1934–1992; aged 58), Greek actress.
Kaori Kawamura (1971–2009; aged 38), Soviet-born Japanese pop singer.
Christine Kay (1964–2019; aged 54), American journalist and editor.
Nikhat Kazmi (1958/1959–2012; aged 53), Indian writer and film critic.
Helen Keane (1923–1996; aged 73), American music producer and manager.
Caron Keating (1962–2004; aged 41), Northern Irish television presenter.
June Keithley (1947–2013; aged 66), Filipino actress, journalist and activist.
Dorothea Kent (1916–1990; aged 74), American film actress.
Margaret Kilgallen (1967–2001; aged 33), American artist.
Angela King (1938–2007; aged 68), Jamaican diplomat.
Kat Kinkade (1930–2008; aged 77), a founder of the Twin Oaks experimental utopian community near Charlottesville, Virginia.
Anne Kirkbride (1954–2015; aged 60), English actress (Coronation Street).
Judy Lee Klemesrud (1939–1985; aged 46), American journalist (The New York Times).
Mao Kobayashi (1982–2017; aged 34), Japanese actress and television presenter.
Susan G. Komen (1943–1980; aged 36), American breast cancer activist.
Sylva Koscina (1933–1994; aged 61), Yugoslav-born Italian actress.
Lynne Kosky (1958–2014; aged 56), Australian politician.
Kris Kovick (1951–2001; aged 50), American writer, cartoonist and LGBT rights activist.
Gabriela Kownacka (1952–2010; aged 58), Polish film and television actress.
Irene Kral (1932–1978; aged 46), American jazz singer.
Rose Kushner (1929–1990; aged 60), American journalist and advocate for breast cancer patients.
Jewel Lafontant (1922–1997; aged 75), American politician and activist.
Joy Langan (1943–2009; aged 66), Canadian politician and writer.
Joi Lansing (1929–1972; aged 43), American actress and model.
Jennifer Lash (1938–1993; aged 55); English novelist and painter.
Peg Lautenschlager (1955–2018; aged 62), American attorney, politician and activist.
Frances Lear (1923–1996; aged 73), Lear magazine publisher.
Violette Leduc (1907–1972; aged 65), French novelist and memoirist.
Anna Maria Lenngren (1754–1817; aged 62), Swedish feminist writer and poet.
Élisabeth Leseur (1866–1914; aged 47), French mystic and spiritual diarist.
Andrea Levy (1956–2019; aged 62), English novelist (Small Island, The Long Song)
Lorraine Hunt Lieberson (1954–2006; aged 52), American mezzo-soprano. Her younger sister, Alexis, also died from breast cancer in 2000.
Sacheen Littlefeather (1946–2022; aged 75), American model who attained notoriety when she delivered Marlon Brando's Oscar rejection speech in 1973.
Laura Liu (1966–2016; aged 49), American judge.
Marilyn Lloyd (1929–2018; aged 89), American politician and businesswoman.
Megan Lloyd George (1902–1966; aged 64), Welsh politician and daughter of Prime Minister David Lloyd George.
Sondra Locke (1944–2018; aged 74), American actress and director. She died from cardiac arrest related to breast and bone cancers.
Barbara Loden (1932–1980; aged 48), American actress, model and theatre director.
Victoria Longley (1960–2010; aged 49), Australian actress.
Audre Lorde (1934–1992; aged 58), American writer and activist.
Juliette Gordon Low (1860–1927; aged 67), American founder of Girl Scouts of the USA.
Cynthia Lufkin (1962–2013; aged 51), American philanthropist, cancer research advocate and co-chairman of The Breast Cancer Research Foundation.
Catherine Mackin (1939–1982; aged 43), American television journalist and news correspondent.
Sarah Maguire (1957–2017; aged 60), English poet, broadcaster and translator.
Ruth Maleczech (1939–2013; aged 74), American avant-garde stage actress. She died from breast cancer and chronic obstructive pulmonary disease.
Linda Kay Manns (1965–2008; aged 43), American model and businesswoman.
Agnes Mary Mansour (1931–2004; aged 73), American biochemist and former Catholic nun.
Maja Maranow (1961–2016; aged 54), German actress.
Vera Maretskaya (1906–1978; aged 72), Soviet and Russian actress and gourmand.
Michele Marsh (1954–2017; aged 63), American television journalist and news anchor.
Marie-Azélie Guérin Martin (1831–1877; aged 45), French laywoman and mother of St Thérèse de Lisieux.
Shirley Ardell Mason (1923–1998; aged 75), American artist and art teacher.
Helene Mayer (1910–1953; aged 42), German world champion Olympic fencer. 
Linda McCartney (1941–1998; aged 56), American singer, animal rights activist and first wife of Sir Paul McCartney.
Helen McCrory (1968–2021; aged 52), English actress (Peaky Blinders, Harry Potter, Skyfall, The Queen, Doctor Who).
Hattie McDaniel (1893–1952; aged 57), Academy Award-winning American actress and 1st African-American to win an Academy Award.
William McGhee (1930–2007; aged 76), American actor. He also suffered from colon and prostate cancer throughout his life.
Olga A. Méndez (1925–2009; aged 82), American politician.
Dame Helen Metcalf (1946–2003; aged 57), British educator, academic and politician.
Sylvia Millecam (1956–2001; aged 45), Dutch actress and comedian.
Maryam Mirzakhani (1977–2017; aged 40), Iranian mathematician and academic.
Yūko Mizutani (1964–2016; aged 51), Japanese actress, voice artist, narrator and singer.
Mary Ann Mobley (1937–2014; aged 77), American actress, television personality and Miss America (1959).
Kathryn Morrison (1942–2013; aged 71), American politician.
Karen Montgomery (1949–2015; aged 66), American actress and film producer.
Charlotte Moorman (1933–1991; aged 57), American cellist and performance artist.
Claire Morissette (1950–2007; aged 57), Quebec-based Canadian activist and cycling advocate.
Jean Muir (1928–1995; aged 66), English fashion designer.
Karen Muir (1952–2013; aged 60), South African competitive swimmer.
Joan Patricia Murphy (1936/1937–2016; aged 79), American politician.
Sue Napier (1948–2010; aged 62), Australian politician and first female Leader of the Tasmanian Opposition Party.
Melissa Nathan (1968–2006; aged 37), British novelist and journalist.
Phyllis Nelson (1950–1998; aged 47), American singer ("Move Closer").
Dame Olivia Newton-John (1948–2022; aged 73), British-Australian actress, singer and activist (Grease, "Physical").
John W. Nick (1933–1991; aged 58), American male breast cancer patient and activist in whose name The John W. Nick Foundation was established.
Jerri Nielsen (1952–2009; aged 57), American physician who famously biopsied and treated herself for breast cancer in Antarctica.
Marni Nixon (1930–2016; aged 86), American ghost singer, soprano, voice artist and actress.
Bernie Nolan (1960–2013; aged 52), Irish singer, actress and television personality (The Nolans).
Meyera Oberndorf (1941–2015; aged 74), American politician and 23rd Mayor of Virginia Beach, Virginia (1988–2008).
Eileen O'Connell (1947–2000; aged 53), Nova Scotian politician.
Ai Ogawa (1947–2010; aged 62), National Book Award-winning American poet, writer and educator.
Siobhán O'Hanlon (1963–2006; aged 43), Northern Irish Sinn Féin official and former PIRA member.
Gayle Olinekova (1953–2003; aged 50), Canadian marathon runner and bodybuilder.
Jenny Olsson (1979–2012; aged 32), Swedish cross-country skier.
Katherine O'Regan (1946–2018; aged 71), New Zealand politician and government minister.
Louise Marie Adélaïde de Bourbon, Duchess of Orléans (1753–1821; aged 68), French noblewoman.
Deborah Orr (1962–2019; aged 57), Scottish journalist and author (The Guardian, The Independent).
Vikki Orvice (1962–2019; aged 56), British sports journalist.
Elizabeth Owens (1928–2005; aged 77), German-born American stage actress.
Grace Paley (1922–2007; aged 84), American poet, writer and political activist.
Polixeni Papapetrou (1960–2018; aged 57), Australian photographer.
Sarah Parkinson (1962–2003; aged 41), British actress, writer and television and radio producer.
Lily Parr (1905–1978; aged 73), English professional women's football player.
Tatjana Patitz (1966–2023; aged 56), German model and actress.
Edith Pechey (1845–1908; aged 63), one of the first British female medical doctors and women's rights activist.
Ellen Pence (1948–2012; aged 63), American sociologist and social activist against domestic violence.
Susan Peretz (1940–2004; aged 64), American film and television actress.
Nancy M. Petry (1968–2018; aged 49), American psychologist.
Ruth Picardie (1964–1997; aged 33), English journalist and editor.
Heather Pick (1970–2008; aged 38), American television news reporter and activist for breast cancer and juvenile diabetes awareness.
Kelly Preston (1962–2020; aged 57), American actress, model and wife of actor John Travolta.
Mona-Lisa Pursiainen (1951–2000; aged 49), Finnish female athlete and sprinter.
Barbara Pym (1913–1980; aged 66), English novelist (Excellent Women, A Glass of Blessings).
Dina Rabinovitch (1962–2007; aged 44), American-born British writer and journalist.
Irma Rangel (1931–2003; aged 71), American politician. She died from inflammatory breast cancer.
Raylene Rankin (1960–2012; aged 52), Canadian singer (The Rankin Family).
Elayne Rapping (1938–2016; aged 77), American critic, author and analyst of popular culture.
Lynn Redgrave (1943–2010; aged 67), Golden Globe Award-winning English stage, film and television actress.
Sandra Reemer (1950–2017; aged 66), Indo-Dutch singer and television presenter.
Wendy Richard (1943–2009; aged 65), English actress (EastEnders, Are You Being Served?).
Minnie Riperton (1947–1979; aged 31), American singer-songwriter and mother of actress Maya Rudolph.
Cokie Roberts (1943–2019; aged 75), American journalist, author and television personality.
Toby Robins (1931–1986; aged 55), Canadian actress, television personality and journalist.
Rod Roddy (1937–2003; aged 66), American radio and television announcer. He also suffered from colon cancer throughout his life.
Ann Marie Rogers (1952–2009; aged 57), British campaigner who won a landmark legal battle against the British NHS to allow people with cancer access to the drug Herceptin.
Lorena Rojas (1971–2015; aged 44), Mexican actress and singer-songwriter.
Roxie Roker (1929–1995; aged 66), American actress and mother of singer-songwriter Lenny Kravitz.
Kate Ross (1956–1998; aged 41), American lawyer and mystery writer.
Carolyn Rovee-Collier (1942–2014; aged 72), American psychologist, academic and educator.
Rosalind Russell (1907–1976; aged 69), American actress, comedienne, screenwriter and singer (His Girl Friday).
Caroline St John-Brooks (1947–2003; aged 56), Anglo-Irish journalist and academic.
Sandra Sakata (1940–1997; aged 57), American fashion designer and retailer.
May Sarton (1912–1995; aged 83), Belgian-American poet, novelist and memoirist.
Screechy Peach (1959–2007; aged 47), American singer-songwriter.
Eve Kosofsky Sedgwick (1950–2009; aged 58), American academic scholar in gender studies and queer theory.
Irene Mayer Selznick (1907–1990; aged 83), American socialite and theatrical producer.
Elizabeth Seymour, Duchess of Somerset (1667–1722; aged 55), Mistress of the Robes to Anne, Queen of Great Britain.
Dame Daphne Sheldrick (1934–2018; aged 83), Kenyan-British author, conservationist and expert in animal husbandry.
Susan Sheridan (1947–2015; aged 68), English actress and voice artist.
Carol Shields (1935–2003; aged 68), American-born Canadian novelist and short story writer.
Yumiko Shige (1965–2018; aged 53), Japanese sailor.
Rochelle Lee Shoretz (1972–2015; aged 42), American civil servant and founder of Sharsheret.
Marjorie Shostak (1945–1996; aged 51), American anthropologist.
Annarita Sidoti (1969–2015; aged 45), Italian race walker.
Hollis Sigler (1948–2001; aged 53), American artist and educator.
Ricky Silberman (1937–2007; aged 69), American conservative activist who co-founded the Independent Women's Forum.
Morag Siller (1969–2016; aged 46), Scottish actress, voice artist and radio personality.
Anya Krugovoy Silver (1968–2018; aged 49), American poet.
Tara Simmons (1984–2019; aged 34), Australian musician.
Lucy Simon (1940–2022; aged 82), American singer and composer.
Susan Raab Simonson (1969–2006; aged 37), American stage actress and theatre producer.
Naomi Sims (1948–2009; aged 61), American model, businesswoman and author.
Ingrid Sischy (1952–2015; aged 63), South African-born American magazine editor and critic.
Abigail Adams Smith (1765–1813; aged 48), daughter of Abigail and John Adams, 2nd President of the United States.
Katarzyna Sobczyk (1945–2010; aged 65), Polish singer.
Soraya (1969–2006; aged 37), Colombian-American singer-songwriter, guitarist, arranger and record producer.
Jo Spence (1934–1992; aged 58), British photographer and cultural worker.
Wendie Jo Sperber (1958–2005; aged 47), American actress (Back to the Future, I Wanna Hold Your Hand, Bachelor Party).
Dusty Springfield (1939–1999; aged 59), English singer ("You Don't Have to Say You Love Me", "Son of a Preacher Man")
Srividya (1953–2006; aged 53), Indian actress.
Deborah Lynn Steinberg (1961–2017; aged 55), American-British academic, author, educator and sociologist.
Heather Stilwell (1944–2010; aged 66), Canadian politician who strongly opposed homosexuality, abortion and sex education.
Athena Starwoman (1945–2004; aged 59), Australian astrologer, columnist for Vogue and Woman's Day, and television commentator.
Kaye Stevens (1932–2011; aged 79), American singer and actress (Days of Our Lives).
Nettie Stevens (1861–1912; aged 50), American geneticist who discovered sex chromosomes.
Pat Stevens (1945–2010; aged 64), American actress.
Lynne Stewart (1939–2017; aged 77), American lawyer and activist. She died from complications from breast cancer and a series of strokes.
Rose Pastor Stokes (1879–1933; aged 53), American writer, feminist and socialist.
Marie Stopes (1880–1958; aged 78), Scottish author, palaeobotanist and birth control advocate.
Susan Strasberg (1938–1999; aged 60), American actress (The Diary of Anne Frank).
Marcia Strassman (1948–2014; aged 66), American actress and singer.
Barbara Strauch (1951–2015; aged 63), American author, reporter and newspaper editor.
Rell Kapolioka'ehukai Sunn (1950–1998; aged 47), American world surfing champion.
Jacqueline Susann (1918–1974; aged 56), American novelist and actress.
Deborah Sussman (1931–2014; aged 83), American graphic designer and artist.
Myfanwy Talog (1944–1995; aged 50), Welsh actress.
Yoshiko Tanaka (1956–2011; aged 55), Japanese actress and singer.
Jennie Faulding Taylor (1843–1904; aged 60), British Protestant missionary to China.
Melanie Tem (1949–2015; aged 65), American horror and dark fantasy author.
Empress Theodora (c. 500–548; aged 48), Empress of the Byzantine Empire and wife of Emperor Justinian I.
Betty Thompson (1934–1994; aged 60), Canadian television personality and presenter.
Penny Thomson (1950–2007; aged 56), Scottish stage and television director.
Jane Tomlinson (1964–2007; aged 43), English athlete and fundraiser for cancer charities.
Carol Tomlinson-Keasey (1942–2009; aged 66), American psychologist and educator.
Margaret Tor-Thompson (1962–2007; aged 44), Liberian political activist and biblical scholar.
Reina Torres de Araúz (1932–1982; aged 49), Panamanian anthropologist, ethnographer and professor.
Marietta Peabody Tree (1917–1991; aged 74), American socialite and political reporter.
Louise Troy (1933–1994; aged 60), American stage and television actress.
Tatiana Troyanos (1938–1993; aged 54), American mezzo-soprano.
Harriet Van Horne (1920–1998; aged 77), American newspaper columnist and television critic.
Danitra Vance (1954–1994; aged 40), American actress and comedian.
Vivian Vance (1909–1979; aged 70), American actress and singer. She died from breast and bone cancer as a result of metastasis. 
Amelyn Veloso (1974–2017; aged 43), Filipino journalist and broadcaster.
Victoria, Princess Royal (1840–1901; aged 60), German Empress and Queen of Prussia by her marriage to Frederick III; eldest daughter of Queen Victoria and mother of Kaiser Wilhelm.
Elvie Villasanta (1928–2013; aged 85), Filipina actress and comedian.
Janice E. Voss (1956–2012; aged 55), American engineer and NASA astronaut.
Margaret Walker (1915–1998; aged 83), American poet, writer and academic.
Tricia Walker (1964–2018; aged 53), British author.
Amalie von Wallmoden, Countess of Yarmouth (1704–1765; aged 61), Principal Mistress of King George II of Great Britain.
Pat Ward (1957–2012; aged 55), American politician and Iowa State Senator (2004–2012).
Geraldine Warrick-Crisman (1930–2007; aged 76), American television executive and former assistant New Jersey state treasurer.
Angela Webber (1955–2007; aged 52), Australian writer and comedian.
Mary Ann Coady Weinand (1959–2007; aged 47), American psychiatrist.
Andrea West (1952–2010; aged 57), Australian teacher and politician.
Anne Wexler (1930–2009; aged 79), American lobbyist and political advisor.
Anne Wiazemsky (1947–2017; aged 70), French actress and novelist. 
Dorothy Wilde (1895–1941; aged 45), Anglo-Irish socialite and niece of Oscar Wilde.
Rebecca Wilson (1961–2016; aged 54), Australian sports journalist.
Thelma Wood (1901–1970; aged 69), American sculptor.
Gretchen Wyler (1932–2007; aged 75), American actress, singer and dancer.
Chen Xiaoxu (1965–2007; aged 41), Chinese actress and Buddhist nun.
Kim Yale (1953–1997; aged 43), American writer and editor for comic books.
Yao Beina (1981–2015; aged 33), Chinese singer-songwriter.
Kay Yow (1942–2009; aged 66), American basketball coach.
Laura Ziskin (1950–2011; aged 61), American film and television producer.
Judith D. Zuk (1951–2007; aged 55), American conservationist, horticulturist and environmentalist.

Death attributed to other causes
Bella Abzug (1920–1998; aged 77), American lawyer, politician and women's movement leader. She had been battling breast cancer for a number of years before developing heart disease, which claimed her life; however, it was never publicly disclosed if the cancer had become advanced or metastasized, or what stage it was; called for grassroots action to stop the environmental pollution fuelling the cancer epidemic; refused to call herself a breast cancer survivor, saying, "I'm a breast cancer fighter, and that's what we all must be if we are going to change things".
Kaye Ballard (1925–2019; aged 93), American actress, comedian and singer. She died from kidney cancer.
Frances Bavier (1902–1989; aged 86), American stage and television actress. She died from congestive heart failure, myocardial infarction, coronary artery disease and atherosclerosis, with supporting factors being breast cancer, arthritis, and chronic obstructive pulmonary disease.
Erma Bombeck (1927–1996; aged 69), American columnist and author. She had breast cancer and was later diagnosed with adult polycystic kidney disease and died during a kidney transplant.
Eileen Brennan (1932–2013; aged 80), American actress. She survived breast cancer but was later diagnosed with bladder cancer.
Edward Brooke (1919–2015; aged 95), American politician who represented Massachusetts in the United States Senate (1967–1979). He died from natural causes.
Frances Burney (1752–1840; aged 88), English novelist, diarist and playwright. She survived breast cancer.
Julia Child (1912–2004; aged 91), American cooking teacher, author, television personality and World War II intelligence agent. She survived breast cancer and died from natural causes.
Lili Chookasian (1921–2012; aged 90), Armenian-American contralto. She survived breast cancer twice during her lifetime. She died from natural causes 50 years later.
Flick Colby (1946–2011; aged 65), American dancer, choreographer and founder member of Pan's People. She died from bronchopneumonia.
Nellie Connally (1919–2006; aged 87), First Lady of Texas as the wife of the 39th Governor of Texas John Connally (1963–1969). She survived breast cancer and died from natural causes.
Linda Cook (1948–2012; aged 63), American actress. She was diagnosed with breast cancer in 1992, and later died from undisclosed causes.
Ruby Dee (1922–2014; aged 91), American stage, film and television actress. She survived breast cancer and later died from natural causes.
Delia Derbyshire (1937–2001; aged 64), English pianist and composer of electronic music. She died from kidney failure while recovering from surgery.
Diana Douglas (1923–2015; aged 92), American actress, first wife of actor Kirk Douglas and mother of Michael and Joel Douglas. She survived breast cancer, but later died from an unspecified cancer.
Queen Elizabeth The Queen Mother (1900–2002; aged 101), British Queen Consort of King George VI and mother of Queen Elizabeth II and Princess Margaret, Countess of Snowdon. She survived both breast and colon cancer, roughly two decades apart, although both were kept secret during her lifetime. The cancer incidences did not become public knowledge until an official biography was published in 2009, seven years after her death from natural causes.
Betty Ford (1918–2011; aged 93), First Lady of the United States as the wife of 38th President Gerald Ford (1974–1977). She survived breast cancer and later died from a stroke.
Wenche Foss (1917–2011; aged 93), Norwegian actress. She survived breast cancer.
France Gall (1947–2018; aged 70), French yé-yé singer. She died from an infection complicated by cancer of an undisclosed nature.
Greta Garbo (1905–1990; aged 84), Swedish-American actress. She apparently survived breast cancer following a double mastectomy. Her causes of death per one of her biographies were stomach and kidney failure and pneumonia.
Paulette Goddard (1910–1990; aged 79), American actress. She apparently survived breast cancer, but later died at her villa in Porto Ronco, Switzerland from heart failure under respiratory support due to emphysema.
Rosalie Gower (1931–2013; aged 82), Canadian nurse, civil servant and city councillor. She survived breast cancer, but later died from a stroke.
Ruth Handler (1916–2002; aged 85), American creator of Barbie and Nearly Me prosthetics. She survived breast cancer in the 1970s, but later died following colon cancer surgery.
Julie Harris (1925–2013; aged 87), Emmy and Tony Award-winning American actress. She survived breast cancer, but later died from heart failure following several strokes.
Alma Reville, Lady Hitchcock (1899–1982; aged 82), English-American film director, editor, screenwriter and wife of Sir Alfred Hitchcock. She survived breast cancer and later died from natural causes.
Connie Johnson (1977–2017; aged 40), Australian philanthropist. She suffered from bone cancer at age 11, uterine cancer at age 22, and finally breast cancer at age 33. She died from liver cancer at age 40.
Jennifer Jones (1919–2009; aged 90), Academy Award-winning American film actress. She survived breast cancer and later died from natural causes.
Carolyn Kaelin (1961–2015; aged 54), American physician, surgeon and breast cancer researcher. She survived breast cancer that was first diagnosed in 2003, and later died from a glioblastoma multiforme brain tumor.
Vera Katz (1933–2017; aged 84), American politician, first female Speaker of the Oregon House of Representatives, and 45th Mayor of Portland, Oregon. She was later diagnosed with adenosarcoma, and died from leukemia.
Jean Keene (1923–2009; aged 85), American activist and rodeo trick rider. She underwent a mastectomy in 1994 and was labelled as a "breast cancer survivor". She later died from undisclosed causes.
Kathy Keeton (1939–1997; aged 58), South African-born American Penthouse magazine publisher and wife of fellow publisher Bob Guccione. She died from complications during surgery on an intestinal obstruction after having first treated herself with hydrazine sulfate, reportedly reducing the size and number of tumors.
Evelyn Lauder (1936–2011; aged 75), Austrian-American businesswoman, socialite, philanthropist and breast cancer awareness activist. She died from ovarian cancer.
Nikolai Leskov (1831–1895; aged 64), Russian writer. He was diagnosed with male breast cancer as well as angina pectoris, asthma and other ailments, so it is impossible to know what role the cancer played as the deciding cause of death.
Shari Lewis (1933–1998; aged 65), American ventriloquist, puppeteer, entertainer and singer. She survived breast cancer, but later died from uterine cancer.
Myrna Loy (1905–1993; aged 88), American film, stage and television actress. She had a double mastectomy, but died during surgery for undisclosed causes. 
Arlene Martel (1936–2014; aged 78), American actress and dancer. Her primary cause of death was given as complications from coronary artery bypass surgery but she had also been battling breast cancer over the last five years of her life.
Jan Maxwell (1956–2018; aged 61), Drama Desk Award-winning American actress and singer. She died from meningitis complicated by breast cancer.
Rue McClanahan (1934–2010; aged 76), Emmy Award-winning American actress (The Golden Girls, Mama's Family, Maude). She survived breast cancer, but later died from a stroke.
Susannah McCorkle (1946–2001; aged 55), American jazz singer. She survived breast cancer but suffered for many years from clinical depression and committed suicide by jumping off the balcony of her apartment in Manhattan.
Jane McGrath (1966–2008; aged 42), Australian cancer support campaigner and wife of cricket champion Glenn McGrath. She was originally diagnosed with breast cancer, and later bone cancer (declared in remission). She later died from complications during brain tumor surgery.
Soong Mei-ling (1898–2003; aged 105), Chinese political figure, painter and First Lady of the Republic of China as the wife of Generalissimo and President Chiang Kai-shek. She died from natural causes in New York City.
Charlotte Mitchell (1926–2012; aged 85), English actress and poet. She died from pneumonia, after previously suffering from breast cancer and myeloma.
Anna Moffo (1932–2006; aged 73), Italian-American singer and operatic soprano. She died from a stroke after battling with complications from breast cancer for a decade.
Shelley Morrison (1936–2019; aged 83), American film and television actress. She also had lung cancer.
Kitten Natividad (1948–2022; aged 74), Mexican pornographic actress and model. She reportedly died from kidney failure.
Alla Nazimova (1879–1945; aged 66), Russian-born American stage and film actress. She survived breast cancer but died due to a coronary thrombosis.
Jocelyn Newman (1937–2018; aged 80), Australian barrister, solicitor, Senator for Tasmania and government minister. She survived both breast and uterine cancer, but later died from Alzheimer's disease.
Phyllis Newman (1933–2019; aged 86), American actress and singer. She died from a lung disorder.
Anna Belle Clement O'Brien (1923–2009; aged 86), Tennessee politician who worked for legislation to benefit breast cancer patients following her own diagnosis in the 1980s. She later died from a fall.
Minnie Pearl (1912–1996; aged 83), American Grand Ole Opry star, country comic, singer and philanthropist. She died from complications from a stroke.
Claire Rayner (1931–2010; aged 79), English nurse, journalist and activist. She also suffered from Graves' disease. She never recovered from emergency intestinal surgery she received in May 2010, and died in hospital on October 11, 2010, aged 79.
Nancy Reagan (1921–2016; aged 94), First Lady of the United States as the wife of 40th President Ronald Reagan (1981–1989). She died from congestive heart failure.
Rita Reys (1924–2013; aged 88), Dutch jazz singer who received the title of "Europe's First Lady of Jazz" at the 1960 French Jazz Festival of Juan-les-Pins. She died from a stroke.
Fiona Richardson (1966–2017; aged 50), Australian politician and officeholder. She was diagnosed with breast cancer in 2013 and went into remission and returned to Parliament. In 2017, she announced she had several tumours. It was unclear if the breast cancer recurred or if it was a different cancer.
Happy Rockefeller (1926–2015; aged 88), American philanthropist, socialite and second wife of the 41st Vice President of the United States Nelson Rockefeller. She died following a short illness.
Dame Rosemary Rue (1928–2004; aged 76), British physician, civil servant and one-time regional general manager and medical officer of the Oxford Regional Health Authority. She died from bowel cancer.
Jean Simmons (1929–2010; aged 80), British-American actress. She was treated successfully for breast cancer, but later died from lung cancer.
Susan Sontag (1933–2004; aged 71), American author, philosopher and political activist. She was initially diagnosed with advanced or metastatic breast cancer, but she later died from leukemia traceable to the doses of radiotherapy and chemotherapy she had received decades earlier for her breast cancer. She was also diagnosed with a rare form of uterine cancer shortly before her death, which did not appear to contribute to her death.
Gloria Stuart (1910–2010; aged 100), American actress, visual artist and activist (Titanic). She was successfully treated for breast cancer.
Henny van Andel-Schipper (1890–2005; aged 115), Dutch supercentenarian who was the "World's Oldest Person" from May 29, 2004 until her death on August 30, 2005. She was successfully treated for breast cancer at the age of 100, 15 years before her death. She later died from an unrelated stomach cancer.
Joan Sydney (1936–2022; aged 86), English-born Australian actress (Neighbours). She was diagnosed with breast cancer in 2015, alongside Alzheimer's disease, which eventually led to her death in 2022.
Shirley Temple (1928–2014; aged 85), Academy Award-winning child actress, diplomat and former United States Ambassador to Ghana and Czechoslovakia. She is believed to have been the first well-known public figure to publicly announce her breast cancer diagnosis in 1973. She later died from chronic obstructive pulmonary disease.
Linda Tripp (1949–2020; aged 70), American former federal government employee who played a significant role in the impeachment proceedings against then 42nd President Bill Clinton following the Clinton-Lewinsky scandal in 1998. She later died from pancreatic cancer.
Barbara Vucanovich (1921–2013; aged 91), American politician (R-NV), the first woman to represent Nevada in the United States House of Representatives (1983–1997). She later died from natural causes.
Marcia Wallace (1942–2013; aged 70), American comedian and voice actress (The Bob Newhart Show, The Simpsons). She died from complications from pneumonia, according to her son, Michael Hawley, who stated his mother was cancer-free at the time of her death. Her long-time friend Cathryn Michon told Deadline Hollywood that Wallace "passed at 9pm last night due to complications from breast cancer of which she was a long and proud survivor and advocate for women and healing", according to The Mirror (UK); it is unclear which is more accurate.
Linda Waterfall (1950–2019; aged 69), American singer-songwriter. Survived breast cancer but died from an undisclosed long illness.
Mary Wickes (1910–1995; aged 85), American actress. She suffered from numerous ailments in the last years of her life, including kidney failure, massive gastrointestinal bleeding, severe hypotension and ischemic cardiomyopathy, with contributing causes listed as anemia and breast cancer. She was hospitalized due to respiratory problems at UCLA Medical Center, where she reportedly broke her hip after a fall, prompting surgery. She died from complications following that surgery.
Mickey Wright (1935–2020; aged 85), American LPGA Tour professional golfer. She died from a heart attack.

See also
List of people with breast cancer

References

Breast cancer
 
 
Breast cancer